Coccinella californica is a ladybird beetle found in California commonly known as the California lady beetle. It has a red elytra that is usually spotless and a mostly black thorax. Its range is the coastal counties north of the Transverse Ranges.

References 

Coccinellidae
Beetles described in 1843